HMS Chichester was a  or Type 61 aircraft direction frigate of the British Royal Navy.

Service
Chichester was first commissioned in 1958 and in that year rescued crew of the coaster Concha off Milford Haven before the ship sank. The commission took her through the Mediterranean to the Far East returning via South Africa and South America.
In 1963–4 she was refitted in Chatham with macks (masts and stacks) along with type 965 & 993 radar.
In 1968 she deployed for Fishery Protection duties and was accused by the Soviet Union of spying on Soviet naval exercises.

Towards the end of her career, in 1971 the Type 61 frigate was refitted as a Hong Kong guard ship, to replace an ageing Type 12 frigate, due in part to her good range conferred by her diesel machinery. Her radar fit was reduced to radar 978, 993M and the 275, Mk 6 director for the twin 4.5 and a more suitable light arms for patrol off Hong Kong of a 2 single 20mm guns and a 1 X 40mm Bofors.

The election of the Labour Government in 1974 saw a further reduction of naval forces, east of Suez with the frigate being supplemented by five Ton Class minesweepers converted for Patrol duties, as the largest vessels maintaining a presence for protection of British interests. Chichester left Hong Kong in the spring of 1976 to return to the UK.

Following decommissioning Chichester arrived for scrapping at Queenborough on 17 March 1981.

References

Publications
 
 

 

Salisbury-class frigates
1955 ships